Possession is the fifth season of the computer-animated television series Ninjago: Masters of Spinjitzu (titled Ninjago from the eleventh season onward). The series was created by Michael Hegner and Tommy Andreasen. The season aired from 29 June to 10 July 2015, following the fourth season titled Tournament of Elements. It is succeeded by the sixth season, titled Skybound.

The season introduces the ghost of Morro as the main season antagonist, who possesses the central character Lloyd Garmadon. Possession is the first season to include the character of Nya in the ninja team as the Elemental Master of Water. It also introduces Airjitzu, a new ability that is shown to be similar to the show's fictional martial art of Spinjitzu, but allows the ninja characters to levitate off the ground.

Voice cast

Main 

 Jillian Michaels as Lloyd Garmadon, the Green Ninja
 Vincent Tong as Kai, the red ninja and Elemental Master of Fire
 Michael Adamthwaite as Jay, the blue ninja and Elemental Master of Lightning
 Brent Miller as Zane, the white/titanium ninja and Elemental Master of Ice
 Kirby Morrow as Cole, the black ninja and Elemental Master of Earth
 Kelly Metzger as Nya, the Elemental Master of Water and Kai's sister
 Paul Dobson as Sensei Wu, the wise teacher of the ninja
Andrew Francis as Morro
Brian Dobson as Ronin

Supporting 
 Alan Marriott as Dareth
 Mark Oliver as Sensei Garmadon
 Kathleen Barr as Misako
 Jennifer Hayward as P.I.X.A.L. a female nindroid
Brian Dobson as Soul Archer
 Kathleen Barr as Bansha
 Michael Adamthwaite as Wrayth
 Paul Dobson as Ghoultar
Paul Dobson as Fenwick
Michael Donovan as Sensei Yang
Cathy Weseluck as Patty Keys
Lee Tockar as Cyrus Borg
Heather Doerksen as Skylor
Ian James Corlett as Master Chen
Scott McNeil as Clouse

Production

Animation 
The animation for the fifth season was produced at Wil Film ApS in Denmark.

Direction 
The episodes for the fifth season were directed by Jens Møller, Michael Helmuth Hansen, Peter Hausner, and Trylle Vilstrup.

Release 
The season trailer was released on 8 June 2015 on YouTube. The season premiered on 29 June 2015 on Cartoon Network. The episodes were released throughout June and July 2015 until the season finale, which was released in two parts. Curseworld Part 1 was released on 9 July 2015 and Curseworld Part 2 was released on 10 July of the same year.

Plot 
When Lloyd is possessed by the spirit of Morro, the ninja realise that they have lost their elemental powers. Morro attacks Wu and the ninja to obtain Wu's staff, which has three symbols engraved upon it. Morro successfully takes the staff, but Wu has made an imprint of the symbols. Wu explains that Morro was his first pupil and the Elemental Master of Wind. Morro believed that he would become the Green Ninja and was enraged to find out that he was not. He had set out to find the Tomb of the First Spinjitzu Master but never returned. Morro and his three ghost warriors begin their search for the Realm Crystal, which will allow Morro to release the Preeminent, the physical embodiment of the Cursed Realm, into Ninjago.

The first symbol on Wu's staff is a technique known as Airjitzu, which allows the user to levitate off the ground. To learn this technique, the ninja travel to the city of Stiix to find Ronin, who stole the Scroll of Airjitzu from Domu Library. On the way, they encounter Chain Master Wrayth and learn that ghosts can be defeated with water. In Stiix, they search for the scroll but are outwitted by Morro, who takes the scroll, learns Airjitzu and escapes. The ninja discover they can learn Airjitzu by visiting the Temple of Airjitzu. Meanwhile, Nya receives intensive training from Wu and begins to control the element of water. The ninja visit the Temple of Airjitzu, which is haunted by the ghost of Master Yang, and they earn the Scroll of Airjitzu. Yang tries to trap them inside the temple, revealing that anyone who remains inside at dawn will become a ghost. The ninja escape with the scroll, except for Cole, who doesn't get out in time and is transformed into a ghost. He remains in this form throughout Season 5 and Season 6.

After learning Airjitzu, the ninja race to obtain the second symbol, the Sword of Sanctuary. They ascend the Wailing Alps and use Airjitzu to pass through the Blind Man's Eye into a parallel realm called Cloud Kingdom. Morro again outwits them, takes the sword and returns to Ninjago with the ninja in pursuit. On the mountainside, Kai takes the sword from Morro and the ninja use it to pinpoint the location of the third symbol, the Tomb of the First Spinjitzu Master. When they arrive, they face three deadly tests before finding the Realm Crystal. There they encounter Morro, who releases Lloyd and escapes with the crystal. Lloyd is weak, but the ninja find their elemental powers are returning.  Morro uses the Realm Crystal to release an army of ghosts and the Preeminent. The ninja are forced to battle the army of ghosts but realise that they are being overwhelmed and retreat on a paddle steamer. Nya unlocks her True Potential and destroys the enemies with a huge wave. Wu tries to pull Morro from the grasp of the Preeminent but he dies as he hits the water.

Episodes

Reception

Ratings 
The season premier of Possession achieved rank 22 in the top 100 Monday cable originals on 29 June 2015 with 2.05 million viewers.

Critical reception 
Reviewer Melissa Camacho for Common Sense Media gave Possession a 3 out of 5 star rating and noted that the season features cartoon violence but also includes themes of "loyalty, teamwork, and sacrifice". The reviewer also commented, "this a solid choice for action lovers. The loss of a loved one also is a central theme in this series installment."

Other media 
An associated action-adventure game titled Lego Ninjago: Shadow of Ronin was released on 24 March 2015 to accompany the season. It was developed by TT Fusion and published by Warner Bros. Interactive Entertainment. The game is available on PlayStation Vita, Nintendo 3DS and IOS.

References

Primary

Secondary 

Possession
2015 Canadian television seasons
2015 Danish television seasons